Manresa State Beach is a state-protected beach on Monterey Bay near Watsonville in Santa Cruz County, California. Manresa State Beach has two different State owned and operated facilities associated with it: Manresa Main State Beach, and Manresa Uplands State Beach and Campground.

It is operated by the California Department of Parks and Recreation. The  site was established as a California State Beach in 1948.

Manresa Main State Beach hosts the junior lifeguard program which teaching lifesaving, fitness and water safety to children.

See also
 List of beaches in California
List of California state parks

References

External links 

 California State Parks: Manresa State Beach website
 Friends of Santa Cruz State Parks: Manresa State Park

California State Beaches
Beaches of Santa Cruz County, California
Parks in Santa Cruz County, California
Monterey Bay
Protected areas established in 1948
1948 establishments in California
Beaches of Northern California